A question mark  is a type of punctuation mark.

Question mark or ? may also refer to:

Film and television
 ? (film), a 2011 Indonesian film
 ?: A Question Mark, a 2012 Indian film
 Question Mark (TV program), a 1963–1964 Canadian current affairs television program
 "?" (Lost), an episode of Lost

Music
 ? (Bersuit album) (2007)
 ? (Enuff Z'nuff album) (2004)
 ? (Neal Morse album) (2005)
 ? (Nena album) (1984) or its title song
 ? (XXXTentacion album) (2018)
 ?, a 2011 album by Eason Chan
 ?, a 2003 EP by Modwheelmood
 "?", a song by MF Doom from Operation: Doomsday
 "?", a song by Outkast from Stankonia
 "?" (Modern Industry), a song by Fishbone from Fishbone

Science and technology
 Question Mark (aircraft), an aircraft that set the flight endurance record in 1929
 Question mark (butterfly) or Polygonia interrogationis
 ? function or Minkowski's question-mark function
 ?:, in computer programming, a ternary operator
 Elvis operator, a binary operator in certain computer programming languages
 Safe navigation operator, a binary operator in object-oriented programming
 ?, the why not connective in linear logic
 �, the Unicode replacement character
 ⚳, the symbol for the dwarf planet Ceres
 ʔ, the IPA symbol for the glottal stop

People
 Seung-Hui Cho or Question Mark, Virginia Tech massacre shooter
 Rudy "?" Martinez, singer in Question Mark & the Mysterians

Other uses
 ? (bistro), a restaurant in Belgrade, Serbia
 ? (CONFIG.SYS directive)
 ? (chess), in chess annotation symbols, indicates a mistake

See also 
 ? and the Mysterians, an American band
 ?? (disambiguation)
 Inverted question and exclamation marks
 Question (disambiguation)
 Question The Mark, a Welsh punk band
 Matthew Lesko or question mark guy, American author and infomercial host